Molimo-Nthuse is a town in western Lesotho. It stands close to the western approach to the God Help Me Pass, on the banks of the Makhaleng River.

References
Fitzpatrick, M., Blond, B., Pitcher, G., Richmond, S., and Warren, M. (2004) South Africa, Lesotho and Swaziland. Footscray, VIC: Lonely Planet.

Populated places in Lesotho
Makhaleng River